José Canalejas may refer to:

 José Canalejas y Casas (1827–1902), Spanish politician and engineer
 José Canalejas y Méndez (1854–1912), Spanish politician who served as Prime Minister of Spain
 José Canalejas (actor) (1925–2015), Spanish actor